Lekh may refer to:
 Desh Vibhag Lekh, the last and final lekh (testament) of Swaminarayan
 Lekh (film), a 1949 Indian film
 Tegh, Armenia - formerly Lekh
 Lekh (Nepali) - a ridge or mountain high enough to hold winter but not summer snow
 Lekh (film) - 2022 Punjabi film

See also